Aji (meaning Day, Assamese: আজি)  is an Assamese language newspaper published in Guwahati, Assam, India. The paper was launched by the Ramdhenu Prakashan Private Limited in March 2000. The founding chief editor was Ajit Kumar Bhuyan.

On 24 March 2009 the executive editor of the paper, Anil Majumdar, was shot dead. Majumdar had been instrumental in reviving the paper, which had become almost defunct, in recent years. Majumdar, possibly had been targeted because he had been "advocating talks between the ULFA and the government".

References

2000 establishments in Assam
Assamese-language newspapers
Newspapers established in 2000
Mass media in Guwahati